A hobby horse is a costume or character involved in traditional customs such as the morris dance and mummers' play.

Hobby horse or hobbyhorse may also refer to:

 Hobby horse (toy), a toy horse, consisting of a model of a horse's head attached to a stick
 The Hobby Horse, the magazine of the Century Guild of Artists from 1886 to 1892
 The Hobby Horse (film), a 1962 Australian television play
 Irish Hobby, an extinct breed of horse
 A 1972 band around Mary Hopkin
 Dandy horse or hobby horse, an early form of bicycle
 Hobby horsing, a hobby and sport popularised in Finland
 Hobby horse polo, a polo with a hobby horse